Reg Owen (3 February 1921 – 23 May 1978) was an English conductor and arranger.

Owen was born George Owen Smith in Hackney, London, and began playing the saxophone at the age of 15. He played in local groups such as Teddy Joyce's Juveniles and the Royal Kiltie Juniors, before founding his own ensemble whilst still in his teens. He studied with Benny Glassman and then attended the Royal College of Music. During World War II he played in the Bomber Command Band of the RAF, then arranged for Ted Heath and Cyril Stapleton after 1945. In 1954, he had his name legally changed to Reginald Owen. He published a book, the Reg Owen Arranging Method, in 1956, and began writing film scores in 1957, including the scores to Date with Disaster, (1957), There's Always a Thursday,  (1957), Payroll (1961) and Very Important Person (1961). In 1959, he even scored a Top 40 hit in the U.S. with "Manhattan Spiritual", which peaked at #10 on the Billboard Hot 100. The same track reached #20 in the UK Singles Chart in March 1959. A further track, "Obsession", peaked at #43 in the UK in October 1960.

In 1961 Owen moved to Brussels, working as a composer, conductor, and arranger throughout continental Europe. He moved to Spain in the 1970s, and died at the Clinica Limonar in Málaga, on 23 May 1978 at the age of 57.

Recordings
Owens recorded several records under 'Reg Owen' and the 'Reg Owen Orchestra.' Most of his LP albums were with RCA Records, from 1957 to 1962.

References

External links
 
 

1921 births
1978 deaths
English conductors (music)
British male conductors (music)
English film score composers
English male film score composers
20th-century British conductors (music)
20th-century English composers
20th-century British male musicians
20th-century British musicians